Bear Creek is a tributary of the Arkansas River and has its headwaters in Baca County, Colorado. It flows through Baca County into Kansas and through Stanton and Grant Counties and into Kearny County where it converges with the Arkansas River about 8 miles southwest of Lakin, Kansas.

See also

 List of rivers of Colorado
 List of rivers of Kansas

References

External links

Rivers of Colorado
Rivers of Kansas
Rivers of Baca County, Colorado
Rivers of Kearny County, Kansas
Rivers of Grant County, Kansas
Rivers of Stanton County, Kansas